Guanine nucleotide-binding protein G(t) subunit alpha-3, also known as gustducin alpha-3 chain, is a protein subunit that in humans is encoded by the GNAT3 gene.

Gustducin alpha-3 chain is a subunit of the heterotrimeric G protein gustducin that is responsible for basic taste.

References

Further reading